Andrea I Thopia (died in 1342 in Naples) was an Albanian nobleman. In 1338 he inherited the county of Mat from his predecessor Tanusio Thopia.

Andrea had become the son-in-law of the Neapolitan King Robert of Anjou without his consent. It would end up costing him his life. Robert sent his biological daughter Fiametta, whom he had promised to be a wife to a potentate in Morea, via Durres to Greece. In the Albanian port city she met Andreas Thopia, they fell in love and got married. The marriage resulted in two sons, Georg Thopia and Karl Thopia. However, King Robert did not accept the violation of his will to rule. He invited the couple to Naples on the pretext of wanting to reconcile with them and had them executed there.

The sons who remained in Albania survived, and so Prince Karl Thopia was later able to rightly invoke his family ties to a royal house, even though he pursued a policy directed against Anjou throughout his life, because he was not able forgive the one who killed his parents.

See also 
 Thopia family

References

14th-century Albanian people
Thopia family
13th-century births
1342 deaths
Year of birth unknown
Year of death uncertain